Stanton by Bridge is a civil parish in the South Derbyshire district of Derbyshire, England.  The parish contains twelve listed buildings that are recorded in the National Heritage List for England.  Of these, two are listed at Grade I, the highest of the three grades, and the others are at Grade II, the lowest grade.  The parish contains the village of Stanton by Bridge and the surrounding area.  The listed buildings consist of a church, a bridge and causeway, houses and associated structures, farmhouses and a farm building.


Key

Buildings

References

Citations

Sources

 

Lists of listed buildings in Derbyshire